Xylophanes zurcheri is a moth of the family Sphingidae first described by Herbert Druce in 1894.

Distribution 
It is known from Mexico, Costa Rica, Guatemala and Belize.

Description 
It is similar in colour and pattern to Xylophanes undata, but the forewing outer margin is less strongly crenulated, most distal postmedian lines on the forewing upperside are inconspicuous and convex externally, delineating a broad, oval, pale purple-grey patch.

Biology 
Adults are on wing in April, May and June in Costa Rica.

The larvae feed on Psychotria eurycarpa, Psychotria panamensis, Psychotria berteriana, Psychotria correae, Psychotria pittieri and Palicourea salicifolia. There are green and brown forms.

References

zurcheri
Moths described in 1894